Awan Khalsa is a village in Nakodar tehsil, Jalandhar district in the state of Punjab, India.

References

Villages in Nakodar tehsil
Villages in Jalandhar district